Saint-Pancrasse is a former commune in the Isère department in southeastern France. On 1 January 2019, it was merged into the new commune Plateau-des-Petites-Roches.

Population

See also
Communes of the Isère department

References

Former communes of Isère
Isère communes articles needing translation from French Wikipedia